Nancy Dussault (born June 30, 1936)  is an American actress and singer.

She is best known for playing Muriel Rush in the sitcom Too Close for Comfort (1980–1987). In a career spanning over half a century, Dussault received two Tony Award nominations.

Early life
Dussault was born in Pensacola, Florida. Her parents were George Adrian, a naval officer, and Sarah Isabel (née Seitz) Dussault.

Broadway
In 1962, Dussault stepped into the role of Maria in the Broadway production of The Sound of Music. She received a Tony Award nomination in 1961 for Best Featured Actress (Musical) for Do Re Mi and was nominated for her performance in Bajour (1965). Of her performance in Do Re Mi and later career, Bloom and Vlastnik wrote: "Confidently clowning alongside such pros as Phil Silvers and Nancy Walker...she never faded into the scenery. Equally comfortable as a pure soprano or a rangy high belter, her versatility was well captured on the...cast album...Well cast as a situation comedy wife, she spent much of the 1970s and 80s in California."  Other stage shows included Quality Street in 1965 at the Bucks County Playhouse in Pennsylvania.  In 1978 she played the title role in Peter Pan at the Meldoy Top Theatre in Wisconsin and Sacramento Music Circus. She also appeared in the City Center Gilbert & Sullivan NYC Company, directed by Dorothy Raedler, with such Metropolitan Opera singers as Nico Castel, Muriel Costa-Greenspon, and Frank Poretta, Sr.  Dussault took over as the Witch in Into the Woods on Broadway (1987–1989).  She had appeared twelve years earlier in the revue Side by Side by Sondheim on Broadway.  More recently she has appeared at The American Conservatory Theater in San Francisco as Mrs Peachum in "Threepenny Opera" (1999) and as Toinette in Moliere's "The Imaginary Invalid" (2007)

Film
In Arthur Hiller's 1979 film The In-Laws, she played Carol Kornpett, wife of Alan Arkin who played Sheldon S. Kornpett, D.D.S.

Television
On television, Dussault made guest appearances (primarily as a vocalist and dancer) on variety shows of the 1960s, including The Ed Sullivan Show, The Carol Burnett Show, and The Garry Moore Show. She was a regular on the 1970s series The New Dick Van Dyke Show and the long-running CBS game show Match Game.

Dussault played the pivotal character in the 1975 "The Courtesans" episode of Barney Miller (S1 E5), in which creator/producer Danny Arnold threatened to quit his own show if network censors removed a risque line. The resulting publicity over the x-rated episode ensured the series ratings survival, according to Hal Linden.

Dussault guest-starred in an episode of the 1979 NBC anthology series $weepstake$. She also played Ted Knight's wife in the role of photographer Muriel Rush on the 1980s situation comedy Too Close for Comfort. She was part of the first anchor team of the ABC morning show Good Morning America, paired with David Hartman, when that show launched in 1975. Dussault was the first actress to portray the character of Theresa Stemple, the mother of character Jamie Stemple Buchman, in season one of the NBC TV series Mad About You.  In January 1997, she played the mayor of Metropolis in Lois & Clark: The New Adventures of Superman ("Lethal Weapon" - Season 4, Episode 12).

Awards and nominations

References

External links

 

Biography, americantheatrewing.org as of January 2009

1936 births
Living people
Actresses from Florida
American women singers
American film actresses
American musical theatre actresses
American stage actresses
American television actresses
American women television personalities
Musicians from Pensacola, Florida
Singers from Florida
20th-century American actresses
21st-century American actresses
Northwestern University School of Communication alumni
Washington-Liberty High School alumni
Television personalities from Florida